Agonimia octospora is a species of corticolous, (bark-dwelling) squamulose (scaley) lichen in the family Verrucariaceae. It was formally described as a new species in 1978 by lichenologists Brian John Coppins and Peter Wilfred James. The type specimen was collected in Glengarriff Forest in (West Cork (Ireland), where it was found growing on the bark of oak. Characteristics of the lichen include its colourless ascospores that number eight per ascus, and its tiny squamules (up to 0.3 mm long) that are closely attached (adpressed) on its substrate. Its spores typically measure 60–75 by 20–26 μm. The lichen is found in Europe and South America.

References

Verrucariales
Lichens described in 1978
Lichen species
Lichens of Europe
Lichens of South America
Taxa named by Brian John Coppins
Taxa named by Peter Wilfred James